Boca do Mato is a region of Rio de Janeiro, but not officially recognized as a neighborhood.

Geography of Rio de Janeiro (city)